Wright is a town in Schoharie County, New York, United States.  The population was 1,547 at the 2000 census. The town was named after governor Silas Wright.

The Town of Wright is on the county's northeastern corner and is west of Albany.

History 

The town was first settled circa 1735, near Gallupville.

During the American Revolution, in the year 1782, the town was raided by Tories with their native allies, inflicting harm on residents and property.

Wright was formed from the Town of Schoharie in 1846.

Geography

The northern town line is the border of Schenectady County and the eastern town boundary is the border of Albany County.  The western town line is partly defined by the Louse Kill, a tributary of the Fox Creek.

New York State Route 146 intersects New York State Route 443, both east–west highways near Gallupville in Wright.  The intersection is the western terminus of NY-146.

Demographics

As of the census of 2000, there were 1,547 people, 569 households, and 433 families residing in the town.  The population density was 54.0 people per square mile (20.9/km2).  There were 622 housing units at an average density of 21.7 per square mile (8.4/km2).  The racial makeup of the town was 98.64% White, 0.39% African American, 0.26% Native American, 0.19% Asian, 0.06% from other races, and 0.45% from two or more races. Hispanic or Latino of any race were 0.65% of the population.

There were 569 households, out of which 36.2% had children under the age of 18 living with them, 63.8% were married couples living together, 6.9% had a female householder with no husband present, and 23.9% were non-families. 18.8% of all households were made up of individuals, and 7.2% had someone living alone who was 65 years of age or older.  The average household size was 2.72 and the average family size was 3.07.

In the town, the population was spread out, with 26.3% under the age of 18, 6.4% from 18 to 24, 31.5% from 25 to 44, 23.8% from 45 to 64, and 12.0% who were 65 years of age or older.  The median age was 38 years. For every 100 females, there were 100.9 males.  For every 100 females age 18 and over, there were 102.1 males.

The median income for a household in the town was $42,898, and the median income for a family was $46,667. Males had a median income of $32,464 versus $27,171 for females. The per capita income for the town was $19,711.  About 5.5% of families and 8.9% of the population were below the poverty line, including 15.3% of those under age 18 and 6.4% of those age 65 or over.

Communities and locations in Wright 
Echo Pond – A small lake in the northeastern corner of Wright.
Fox Creek – A stream flowing out the eastern border of the town.
Gallupville – A hamlet in the southwestern part of the town by the intersection of NY-146 and NY-443.  It is also the location of the first settlement in the town. The Gallupville Evangelical Lutheran Church, Gallupville Methodist Church, and Gallupville House are listed on the National Register of Historic Places.
Shutter Corners – A hamlet northwest of Gallupville on Route 443. Shutter Corners is located along the Fox Creek and contains  a recognized cave known as the Schoharie Cavern, at Shutter Corners.

References

External links
  Town of Wright, NY
  Early history of Wright
  Berne Historical Project has genealogy of Hilltown families including most early families from Wright.

Towns in Schoharie County, New York